Peter Trafton Snowe (January 16, 1943 – April 10, 1973) was an American businessman and politician.

Early life and education 
Born in Lewiston, Maine, Snowe graduated from Edward Little High School, Auburn, Maine, in 1962. He attended the Bentley College of Accounting and the University of Maine.

Career 
He served in the Maine National Guard and Maine Air National Guard. He was president and treasurer of the Superior Concrete Company, Inc. of Auburn, Maine. On December 29, 1969, Snowe married Olympia Bouchles in New York City. Snowe served in the Maine House of Representatives, from Auburn, Maine, from 1967 until his death in 1973 and was a Republican.

Personal life 
Snowe was killed in an automobile crash on the Maine Turnpike at West Gardiner, Maine.

References

1943 births
1973 deaths
Politicians from Auburn, Maine
Politicians from Lewiston, Maine
Military personnel from Maine
Bentley University alumni
University of Maine alumni
Businesspeople from Maine
Republican Party members of the Maine House of Representatives
Road incident deaths in Maine
20th-century American politicians
Edward Little High School alumni
20th-century American businesspeople